Storms River is a river in the Eastern Cape province of South Africa. The river mouth is located in the Tsitsikamma National Park. The 5 day Otter Trail starts at the Storms River mouth.

See also 
 Tsitsikamma National Park
 Paul Sauer Bridge
 List of rivers of South Africa

References

External links 

Rivers of the Eastern Cape